The Metropolitan Poor Act 1867 was an Act of Parliament of the United Kingdom, the first in a series of major reforms that led to the gradual separation of the Poor Law's medical functions from its poor relief functions. It also led to the creation of a separate administrative authority the Metropolitan Asylums Board.

The legislation provided that a single Metropolitan Poor Rate would be levied across the Metropolis: this being defined as the area of the Metropolitan Board of Works. The Poor Law Board (a central government body) was empowered to form the areas of the various parish and poor law unions into districts for the provision of "Asylums for the Sick, Insane, and other Classes of the Poor".

An order was signed on 16 May 1867, combining all the parishes and unions in the Metropolis into a single Metropolitan Asylum District "for the reception and relief of the classes of poor persons chargeable to some union or parish in the said district respectively who may be infected with or suffering from fever, or the disease of small-pox or may be insane." The Metropolitan Asylums Board was established with 60 members: 45 elected by the various poor law boards of guardians and 15 nominated by the Poor Law Board.

The legislation amended the Poor Law Amendment Act 1834 to allow control over parishes that had been excluded from it by local acts. The ten parishes were St James Clerkenwell, St George Hanover Square, St Giles and St George Bloomsbury, St Mary Islington, St James Westminster, St Luke, St Margaret and St John Westminster, St Marylebone, St Mary Newington and St Pancras.

It permitted the employment of probationary nurses who were trained for a year in the sick asylums. These nurses gradually began to replace the employment of untrained paupers.

References

External links

United Kingdom Acts of Parliament 1867
Acts of the Parliament of the United Kingdom concerning London
English Poor Laws
1867 in London
March 1867 events